Forever More is the sixth studio album by hard rock band Tesla, released on October 7, 2008. The album was produced by Terry Thomas, engineered by Michael Rosen, and recorded and mixed at J Street Recorders in Sacramento, California by Terry Thomas and Michael Rosen. The album cover art portrays the famous “Lovers of Valdaro”, discovered by archaeologists outside of Mantua, Italy, in 2007.

Track listing
All songs written by Tesla (Jeff Keith, Frank Hannon, Brian Wheat, Troy Luccketta and Dave Rude) and Terry Thomas.

Bonus tracks
 "My Way" (European only Bonus Track) - 2:56
 "What A Shame" (live) (European only Bonus Track) - 4:47
 "Mama's Fool" (live) (Japan only Bonus Track)

Personnel
Jeff Keith - lead vocals
Frank Hannon - guitars, piano, backing vocals
Brian Wheat - bass, backing vocals
Troy Luccketta - drums, percussion
Dave Rude - guitars, backing vocals

Charts

References

2008 albums
Tesla (band) albums